Streptomyces thermoalcalitolerans is a bacterium species from the genus of Streptomyces which has been isolated from garden soil in Yogyakarta on Indonesia.

See also 
 List of Streptomyces species

References

Further reading

External links
Type strain of Streptomyces thermoalcalitolerans at BacDive -  the Bacterial Diversity Metadatabase

thermoalcalitolerans
Bacteria described in 1999